The Noida Sector 52 is a metro station on the Blue Line extension of the Delhi Metro railway, in the city of Noida in India.

The station is connected to the Noida Sector 51 metro station on the Noida Metro's Aqua Line by a 300-metre-long pedestrian walkway.  An overhead walkway connecting the two stations will be built by IKEA as part of an agreement between the company and the Noida Authority.

History
Construction works begin in 2015 and was completed on March 8, 2019.

Station layout

Entry/Exit

See also
Delhi
Noida
List of Delhi Metro stations
Transport in Delhi
Delhi Metro Rail Corporation
Delhi Suburban Railway
Delhi Monorail
Delhi Transport Corporation
South East Delhi
New Delhi
National Capital Region (India)
Noida–Greater Noida Expressway
Noida Metro
List of rapid transit systems
List of metro systems

References

External links

 Delhi Metro Rail Corporation Ltd. (Official site) 
 Delhi Metro Annual Reports
 
 UrbanRail.Net – Descriptions of all metro systems in the world, each with a schematic map showing all stations.

Delhi Metro stations
Railway stations in Gautam Buddh Nagar district
Transport in Noida